Prawet is a khwaeng (subdistrict) of Prawet District, in Bangkok, Thailand. In 2020, it had a total population of 87,676 people.

References

Subdistricts of Bangkok
Prawet district